Wendy and Lisa is the eponymous 1987 debut album by American pop duo Wendy & Lisa, formerly of Prince's band, the Revolution.

Background
Five of the eleven tracks on the album were co-written by Bobby Z., Wendy and Lisa's former colleague from the Revolution, who also co-produced the album with the duo. Wendy's twin sister, Susannah Melvoin (an extended Revolution member herself) co-wrote the track "Honeymoon Express".

The album, released in the United States on August 24, 1987, peaked at No. 88 in the US and at No. 84 in the UK. The UK and European release features different cover artwork to the US release.

The album contains several singles, including "Honeymoon Express" and "Waterfall" (which was re-released two years later as "Waterfall '89"). In the US, the only single to hit the Billboard Hot 100 was "Waterfall" which peaked at No. 56 in 1987. "Sideshow" was also released as a single in the UK and Europe. The track "The Life" was re-recorded in the 1990s when it was retitled as "This Is the Life" and produced by Trevor Horn. This version was included on the number-one hit soundtrack album of the film Dangerous Minds (1995) and released as a single in Europe.

The album was reissued in the US in 2006 by Wounded Bird Records, featuring four bonus tracks including "To Trip Is to Fall", which was originally a 12" B-side track. The album was reissued in the UK in 2013 by Cherry Pop Records also featuring four bonus tracks, though two of the tracks differ from the US reissue.

Track listing

Personnel
Credits are adapted from the Wendy and Lisa liner notes.

Wendy & Lisa
Wendy Melvoin – lead and background vocals, guitar, bass, drums and percussion, organ
Lisa Coleman – lead and background vocals, keyboards, piano, synth

Additional musicians
 Jonathan Melvoin – drums and percussion
 Tom Scott – soprano saxophone, lyricon
 Cole Ynda – vocals
 Carla Azar – drums and percussion
 Susannah Melvoin – vocals
 David Coleman – percussion
 Gary Coleman – congas

Charts

References

External links

Wendy & Lisa albums
1987 debut albums
Columbia Records albums